Haemanota vicinula is a moth of the family Erebidae. It was described by Hervé de Toulgoët in 1997. It is found in French Guiana.

References

 

Haemanota
Moths described in 1997